Ali Vali  (Persian: علی والی, born 19 October 1950) is a retired Iranian heavyweight weightlifter who won gold medals at the 1971 Asian Championships and 1974 Asian Games. He also competed at the 1976 Summer Olympics, but failed to complete the clean and jerk event.

References

1950 births
Living people
Iranian male weightlifters
Olympic weightlifters of Iran
Weightlifters at the 1976 Summer Olympics
Asian Games gold medalists for Iran
Asian Games silver medalists for Iran
Asian Games medalists in weightlifting
Weightlifters at the 1974 Asian Games
Medalists at the 1974 Asian Games
20th-century Iranian people